Wasielewski is the name of a German noble family

History 
The Wasielewski family is Catholic and Protestant aristocracy, that commenced with Nicolaus Wasilewski recorded by King Sigismund I. of Poland in 1531. The Prussian line of the family begins with Thaddäus v. Wasielewski (1739–1803) with legitimation as Knights on 26 November 1789.

Coat of arms 
The family coat of arms "ROGALA" shows two horns, a buck horn and a buffalo horn. Both horns are standing upright. The buck horn has from 3 to 6 ends. The buffalo horn also described as a Bull or Wisent horn, is closed or open with a mouthpiece as a war or hunting horn. The horns are upright in a split shield. The family colours are red and white.

Family members 
 Waldemar von Wasielewski (1875–1959), German writer specialized on Occult, Goethe and musicology
 Wilhelm Joseph von Wasielewski (1822–1896), Violinist, conductor and musicologist
 Hugo von Wasielewski (1853–1936), royal Prussian General of the Infantry (Germany)
 Friedrich Carl von Wasielewski (1857–1938), royal Prussian Major General
 Julius von Wasielewski (1813–1891), royal Prussian Major
 Josef von Wasielewski (1851–1911), royal Prussian Major
 Theodor von Wasielewski (1821–1902), royal Prussian Major
 Carl Heinrich von Wasielewski (1811–1873), royal Prussian Colonel
 Heinrich von Wasielewski (1825–1914), royal Prussian Captain Lieutenant
 Wolfgang von Wasielewski (1881–1954), royal Prussian Colonel

Literature 
Genealogisches Handbuch des Adels, Adelslexikon Band XVII, 2008, Band 144 der Gesamtreihe

See also 
List of szlachta

References

 

German noble families